The Bureau of Economic and Business Affairs (EB) is a bureau of the U.S. Department of State charged with promoting economic security and prosperity at home and abroad. It reports to the Under Secretary of State for Economic Growth, Energy, and the Environment. The Bureau's work lies at the nexus of economic prosperity and national security. In addition, EB also addresses a range of economic issues including intellectual property rights, piracy, and counterfeiting. As the single point where international economic policy tools and threads converge, EB helps to promote a coherent economic policy across the U.S. government. Since January 24, 2022 it has been headed by Ramin Toloui.

Organization
The Bureau of Economic and Business Affairs consists of the following divisions:

 Commercial and Business Affairs (EB/CBA);
 Counter Threat Finance & Sanctions (EB/TFS);
 Economic Policy Analysis & Public Diplomacy (EB/EPPD);
 International Communications and Information Policy (EB/CIP);
 International Finance & Development (EB/IFD);
 Trade Policy and Negotiation (EB/TPN); and
 Transportation Affairs (EB/TRA).

References

External links

EB
United States economic policy